Holy Child School is a co-educational secondary school in Bharatpur, Rampur district, Uttar Pradesh, India. The school was founded 1 April 1999 and is managed by the Holy Children Education & Welfare Society. Classes are conducted in English.

References

High schools and secondary schools in Uttar Pradesh
Rampur district
Educational institutions established in 1999
1999 establishments in Uttar Pradesh